Nitai Roy Chowdhury is a Bangladeshi lawyer and politician. He is a vice chairman of the Central Committee of Bangladesh Nationalist Party. He was elected as MP of Magura-2 in Fourth General Election of Bangladesh. He was a State Minister of Ministry of Education, Ministry of Youth and Sports and Ministry of Law, Justice and Parliamentary Affairs. His daughter, advocate Nipun Roy Chowdhury is the member of the BNP Central Executive Committee.

References

Living people
Bangladesh Nationalist Party politicians
People from Magura District
20th-century Bangladeshi lawyers
4th Jatiya Sangsad members
Year of birth missing (living people)